The Azadpur metro station is an interchange station of the Delhi Metro in New Delhi, India. It provides interchanges between Yellow Line and the Pink Line.

Station layout

Connections
From Ring road Azadpur bus stop-

Delhi Transport Corporation bus routes number 78STL, 100, 100A, 100EXT, 101A, 101B, 101EXT, 103, 112, 113, 114, 120, 120A, 120B, 123, 124, 134, 135, 137, 140, 169, 169SPL, 171, 173, 191, 193, 195, 235, 259, 333, 341, 402, 402CL, 883, 901, 901CL, 921, 921CL, 921E, 921EXT, 971, 971A, 971B, 982, 982LSTL, TMS(-) and TMS- Lajpat Nagar/ Azadpur serves the station.

From Karnal road Azadpur bus stop-

Delhi Transport Corporation bus routes number 17, 19A, 106A, 113EXT, 119, 129, 130, 136, 146, 154, 181, 181A, 183, 184, 805A serves the station.

After Phase 4, the station will also serve the Magenta Line and will connect to Yellow Line and Pink Line. After this it will become the second station in Delhi Metro serving three lines after Kashmere Gate metro station.

See also

List of Delhi Metro stations
Transport in Delhi
Delhi Metro Rail Corporation
Delhi Suburban Railway
Delhi Transport Corporation
North Delhi
National Capital Region (India)
List of rapid transit systems
List of metro systems

References

External links

 Delhi Metro Rail Corporation Ltd. (Official site)
 Delhi Metro Annual Reports
 
 UrbanRail.Net – descriptions of all metro systems in the world, each with a schematic map showing all stations.

Delhi Metro stations
Railway stations opened in 2009
Railway stations in North West Delhi district